BITS Open Sports Meet (BOSM) is the annual sports festival of Birla Institute of Technology and Science, Pilani campus. This sports meet, usually held around mid-September is a prominent showcase of sporting talents from around the country and abroad too.

One of the largest student managed Sports fests of the country, BOSM is aimed to provide a platform to colleges from all over India to exhibit their true potential, promoting healthy competition.

History 
BOSM was started back in 1986 when it was a one-day event with the organization done by the institute itself. After a few years, it was set up as a student-run non-profit organization. It is now a four-day festival encompassing everything about sports and witnessing a footfall of over 10,000 students. It is also the only college festival in the country to have an official mascot, Baxter. Several notable personalities have graced the opening ceremony of BOSM, some of whom are : Dinesh Mongia, Rajyavardhan Singh Rathore, Saba Karim, Akhil Kumar and Krishna Poonia among others.

Logo 
The sharp-edges and angular features of the logo exude solidity and stability of the brand that is BOSM-30 years as one of India's biggest student-managed sports fest and going stronger than ever. 
In the middle is depicted BITS Pilani's most iconic emblem-the BITS Pilani clock tower. The clock tower stands tall, representing strength and stability. The time on the clock is 20:14, a play on the current edition of BOSM. The red and yellow hued flames represent fiery aggression, passion for the sport and the fervor to win. 
The final element of the design is the ribbon with the BOSM motto: Grit-the dedication in meticulous preparation, Guts-the courage and determination to give it one's everything for Glory-the deserving reward to a flawless performance.

Events 
BOSM gives the attendees an opportunity to take part in a variety of events.

Sports events 

With the tagline 'Grit. Guts. Glory', BOSM provides an adrenaline rush to the sporty. The major sports events held during the fest are:

Informal Events 
A number of informal events are organized during BOSM pulling crowds in huge numbers. Some of them are: 
 Human Foosball
 Anti-Chess
 Street football
 Angry Birds
 Pac-man
 Laser tag
 Paintball
 Box Cricket
 Tug-Of-War
 Screw-do-ku
 Capturact(Online event)
 Kabaddi

Organization and Departments Involved 
BOSM is mainly organized by the Committee of Students for Sports Activities(CoSSAc), a body of eight members which is the fest committee under Sports Union, BITS Pilani. It consists of four delegates from Sports Union viz. the Sports Secretary, three Joint Sports Secretaries who are responsible for coordinating with all stakeholders of BOSM and responsible for all finances, and heads from the following four departments:
 Dept. of Controls 
 Dept. of Sponsorship and Marketing 
 Dept. of Publications and Correspondence 
 Dept. of Reception and Accommodation 
who are responsible for works specified for their departments.
In addition to the departments listed above, several clubs and minor departments and campus press are involved in the running of the fest. These include Press Clubs, Dept. of Informalz, Firewallz, Photography Club, Creative Activities Club, Gaming Club among others.

Social Cause 
BOSM is the only sports festival of the country to have a Social Connect, in the hope of striking a chord of humanity. 
The major events are:
 Junoon - The major event in this category, Junoon is a Sports cum social event, organized by the Sports Union, BITS Pilani in association with NSS BITS Pilani, for specially abled children. It boasts of over a hundred participants from almost a dozen Non-Government Organisations (like Umang, Greenpeace, Nirmaan, Muskaan, Goonj, Amla Birla Kendra) who battle it out across events ranging from basketball, cricket, football, tennis to cultural competitions. Junoon 2012, the first edition of Junoon was covered by Hindustan Times, New Delhi. 
 BOSM marathon- A ‘run for a cause’ marathon, initiated with the aim to raise awareness about various social issues like women's safety and anti-smoking. 
 YODH- A ‘sports day’ for unprivileged children of the nearby district. 
 Play for a cause- Goodies are given to the needy which translates from the on-field achievements of players. 
 Cleanliness and Tree Plantation Drive

Sponsors and Past Associates 
BOSM every year witnesses top brands from various sectors being associated with it. A few notable partners include Buddh International Circuit(BIC), Pepsi, Nokia, John Players, Nestle, Pizza Hut, Vodafone, Panasonic and the likes. The media sector has seen several names like The Week, Channel V, NDTV etc.

External links

References 

Festivals in Rajasthan
Sport in Rajasthan
College festivals in India
Birla Institute of Technology and Science, Pilani